Veniamin Grigorievich (Benjamin) Levich (30 March 1917 in Kharkiv, Ukraine – 19 January 1987 in Englewood, New Jersey, United States) was a Soviet dissident, internationally prominent physical chemist, electrochemist and founder of the discipline of physico-chemical hydrodynamics. He was a student of the theoretical physicist, Lev Landau. His landmark textbook titled Physicochemical Hydrodynamics is widely considered his most important contribution to science. The Levich equation describing a current at a rotating disk electrode is named after him.  His research activities also included gas-phase collision reactions, electrochemistry, and the quantum mechanics of electron transfer.

Levich received many honors during his life, including the Olin Palladium Award of The Electrochemical Society in 1973. He was elected a foreign member of the Norwegian Academy of Sciences in 1977 and a foreign associate of the U.S. National Academy of Engineering in 1982. He was also a member of numerous scientific organizations, although on leaving the USSR in 1978 he had to relinquish his Soviet citizenship and, therefore, was expelled from the USSR Academy of Sciences. An interdisciplinary institute at the City College of New York is named in his honor.
His son Eugene V. (Yevgeny) Levich also became a physicist, leaving the Soviet Union in 1975 and raising support for other family members.

See also
 Levich constant
 Levich equation
 Landau–Levich problem
 Koutecký–Levich equation
 Induced-charge electrokinetics

References

Further reading 
 

1917 births
1987 deaths
Fluid dynamicists
Electrochemists
National University of Kharkiv alumni
Corresponding Members of the USSR Academy of Sciences
Soviet dissidents
Jewish Ukrainian scientists
Soviet emigrants to the United States